Confessions is the eleventh studio album by American singer and actress Liza Minnelli, released through Decca Records on September 21, 2010, in the United States.

Background
The album, recorded while Minnelli was recovering from knee surgery, marked her first studio release in nearly fifteen years. Originally, the story was these recordings were old tapes that a neighbor in Beverly Hills had discovered, having been recorded some 10 or more years earlier but this story changed after the album's release. The original press release reads: " 
Liza Minnelli (pictured) showed up at her neighbor Bruce Roberts' Beverly Hills door late one night nearly a decade ago saying, "I just feel like singing." Minnelli relaxed on a couch, while Billy Stritch played keyboard, and Liza sang 20 old standards as Roberts tape-recorded the session. Last year, Roberts found the tapes in an old box and realized he had found gold. "They were brilliant. So I tweaked them up," Roberts told us. "It's like having Liza singing in your living room." The duo signed a deal with Decca in November.

Track listing
 "Confession" (Howard Dietz, Arthur Schwartz) – 1:45
 "You Fascinate Me So" (Cy Coleman, Carolyn Leigh) – 3:10
 "All the Way" (Sammy Cahn, Jimmy Van Heusen) – 4:09
 "I Hadn't Anyone Till You" (Ray Noble) – 2:47
 "This Heart of Mine" (Arthur Freed, Harry Warren) – 2:47
 "I Got Lost in His Arms" (Irving Berlin) – 3:43
 "Remind Me" (Dorothy Fields, Jerome Kern) – 3:05
 "Close Your Eyes" (Bernice Petkere) – 2:53
 "He's a Tramp" (Johnny Burke, Peggy Lee) – 2:33
 "I Must Have That Man" (Fields, Jimmy McHugh) – 3:31
 "On Such a Night as This" (Marshall Barer, Hugh Martin) – 3:54
 "Moments Like This" (Burton Lane, Frank Loesser) – 2:46
 "If I Had You" (James Campbell, Reginald Connelly, Ted Shapiro) – 4:48
 "At Last" (Mack Gordon, Warren) – 3:29

References

External links
 Confessions at Decca Records
 Liza Minnelli's official site
 Liza Minnelli’s rare tapes

2010 albums
Decca Records albums
Liza Minnelli albums